Ian Rowland (born 4 March 1941) is a former Australian rules footballer who played for the St Kilda Football Club in the Victorian Football League (VFL).

Rowland played for the Saints from 1960 until 1966 and was St Kilda Football Club's leading goalkicker in 1961.

He played in St Kilda's 1965 Grand Final side which was defeated by 35 points, but was dropped for their victory in 1966, despite playing 18 games during the year, including the previous week.

Rowland coached Finley Football Club in the Murray Football League from 1967 to 1970, then played with North Albury Football Club in 1971, before retiring.

References

External links

Let's Remember, Ian Rowland. Wangaratta Chronicle

1941 births
Australian rules footballers from Victoria (Australia)
St Kilda Football Club players
Wangaratta Football Club players
Living people